Ganda Lawka (lit. "World of Books") was a Burmese language monthly magazine published by the Burma Education Extension Association. The magazine was a sister publication of The World of Books, the English language monthly started by JS Furnivall, and "welcomed modern Burmese prose, original ideas and criticism." It was edited by a succession of young Burmese writers, including Zawgyi, Min Thu Wun, Sein Tin, and Nwe Soe.

References

Bibliography
 
 

Burmese magazines